The 1964 Humboldt State Lumberjacks football team represented Humboldt State College during the 1964 NCAA College Division football season. Humboldt State competed in the Far Western Conference (FWC).

The 1964 Lumberjacks were led by head coach Phil Sarboe in his 14th year at the helm. They played home games at the Redwood Bowl in Arcata, California. Humboldt State finished with a record of eight wins and two losses (8–2, 4–1 FWC). The Lumberjacks outscored their opponents 181–81 for the season.

Schedule

Notes

References

Humboldt State
Humboldt State Lumberjacks football seasons
Humboldt State Lumberjacks football